is a Japanese cricketer who played for Japan in 2003 in One Day International and List A cricket. She was born at Saitama in 1982.

References

1982 births
Living people
Japanese women cricketers